Flavobathelium is a genus of fungi in the family Strigulaceae. A monotypic genus, it contains the single species Flavobathelium epiphyllum.

See also
List of Dothideomycetes genera incertae sedis

References

Lichen genera
Monotypic Dothideomycetes genera
Taxa named by Robert Lücking
Taxa named by André Aptroot
Taxa described in 1997